South Carolina Highway 283 (SC 283) is a  state highway in the U.S. state of South Carolina. The highway connects Plum Branch with rural areas of McCormick and Edgefield counties.

Route description
SC 283 begins at an intersection with U.S. Route 221 (US 221)/SC 28 (Main Street) in Plum Branch, within McCormick County, where the roadway continues as Collier Street. It travels to the east and nearly immediately curves to the east-northeast before leaving the city limits. The highway curves back to the east and crosses over Stevens Creek. SC 283 goes back to the northeast and enters Whitetown. Just past the intersection with Upper Mill Road the highway enters Sumter National Forest. After it starts heading to the east-southeast, it crosses over Byrd Creek. After a crossing of Wine Creek, it crosses over Turkey Creek and enters Edgefield County. Just to the east of an intersection with North Martintown Road, which is south-southwest of Cleora, the highway leaves the national forest. Farther to the east, it meets its eastern terminus, an intersection with US 25, at a point northwest of Edgefield.

Major intersections

See also

References

External links

SC 283 at Virginia Highways' South Carolina Highways Annex

283
Transportation in McCormick County, South Carolina
Transportation in Edgefield County, South Carolina